Lake Udyl is a large freshwater lake in Khabarovsk Krai, Russia. It lies near the left bank of the Amur River.

References

Udyl
Ramsar sites in Russia